Cazimi is an album by American country musician Caitlin Rose, released by Missing Piece and Names on November 18, 2022. The album is Rose's first in almost a decade and has received positive reviews.

Recording and release
Cazimi is Rose's first album in almost a decade, begun at the very beginning of the COVID-19 pandemic and produced for over two years. Previous recording sessions were unfruitful and Rose entered a creative period where she considered quitting music altogether. The release was formally announced in August 2022, with a preview of the track "Black Obsidian", and Rose had previously introduced a music video for "Only Lies" in December 2021. Rose had taken an extended hiatus from performing after losing the joy of it, but she continued writing songs. "Getting It Right" was written around 2014 and "Nobody's Sweetheart" was written in 2016. When she isn't having fun with music, she characterizes her work as "garbage", so she waited until she had the creative spark and an arrangement of musician friends who could finalize the album. The music on Cazimi draws from all of Rose's varied musical interests and influences and she co-produced the album with Jordan Lehning to have a pop quality.

Critical reception

 Reviewing the album for AllMusic, Mark Deming claimed that "it plays to [Rose's] strengths with an ideal balance of solid craft and relatable humanity." For Pitchfork Media, Brad Shoup gave Cazimi a 7.5 out of 10, citing Rose's growth as a songwriter, who can pull from various genres to create a complete song cycle. In Paste, Ellen Johnson scored this release a 7.3 out of 10, noting Rose's "shimmery new sound" and ability to weave multiple genres into country-based music. John Amen of The Line of Best Fit praised the maturity of Rose's lyrics and her ability to offer "a down-to-earth yet reassuring message, expressing faith in our collective resilience"; he rated Cazimi seven out of 10. Hal Horowitz of American Songwriter gave this album three out of five stars, also pointing out the depth of Rose's storytelling, but noting that "songs often don’t feel organic or warm which, with lyrics that are self-reflective, makes some selections seem stiff, pushed too close for the radio play they are reaching for". Steve Horowitz in PopMatters calls this collection "sort of a sonic impressionist painting" where "the blurring [of genres and styles] is intentional and purposeful" and gave the release a seven out of 10. Stereogum named this "Album of the Week", with reviewer Chris Deville praising the songwriting, vocals, and additional musicians, declaring that "each song is a standalone marvel unto itself".

Track listing
"Carried Away" – 4:17
"Modern Dancing" – 3:38
"Getting It Right" – 2:50
"Nobody’s Sweetheart" (Caitlin Rose and Daniel Tashian) – 3:45
"Lil’ Vesta" – 3:08
"Black Obsidian" – 3:05
"How Far Away" – 4:12
"Blameless" – 3:39
"Gemini Moon" – 3:54
"Holdin’" – 3:07
"All Right (Baby’s Got a Way)" – 3:09
"Only Lies" – 3:53

Personnel

Caitlin Rose – vocals, production
Courtney Marie Andrews – vocals on "Getting It Right"
Jordan Lehring – production
William Tyler – guitar

See also
List of 2022 albums

References

External links

Review from Spectrum Culture
Review from MusicOMH

2022 albums
Caitlin Rose albums